Macarena García de la Camacha Gutiérrez-Ambrossi (born 26 April 1988) is a Spanish actress. She won the Goya Award for Best New Actress for her performance in the 2012 silent film Snow White. She has since featured in films such as Palm Trees in the Snow and Holy Camp!.

Biography 
Macarena García de la Camacha Gutiérrez-Ambrossi was born on 26 April 1988 in Madrid. She started her training when she was eight years old with artistic gymnastics. When she was fourteen, she started combining it with dance, both modern as funk, in the Carmen Senra and Academia Broadway dance schools. Rosario Ruiz and Nora Troyani taught her how to sing during some years. In addition, she has complemented her training with guitar classes in the last years. She has an older brother, Javier Ambrossi, also dedicated to acting. She studied psychology at the Autonomous University of Madrid. From 2014 to 2022, she was in a relationship with singer Leiva.

Career 
She got her first role when she was thirteen and performed the role of Canelilla in En nombre de la Infanta Carlota, of Jara productions, a musical which was performed during some seasons in the Theatre of Madrid. She also worked in the musical High School Musical and performed the lead role (Gabriella Montez) with Daniel Diges (Troy Bolton).

Since then, she has taken part in several television series such as Hospital Central, Punta Escarlata and The Boarding School. But the role which made her known was the one of Chelo, the daughter of the doormen in Amar en tiempos revueltos from 2010 to 2012. In 2013, she played Vera on Luna, el misterio de Calenda, a series of Antena 3.

In cinema, she has performed the leading role in Snow White, directed by Pablo Berger. This work has brought her very important awards, such as the Silver Shell for Best Actress in the San Sebastián International Film Festival and the Goya Award for Best New Actress.

Filmography

Television

Film

Accolades

References

External links
 

1988 births
Living people
Autonomous University of Madrid alumni
Actresses from Madrid
21st-century Spanish actresses
Spanish film actresses
Spanish television actresses
Spanish stage actresses